Ruan Potts (born 24 August 1977) is a South African professional mixed martial artist currently competing in the Heavyweight division. A professional competitor since 2011, Potts formerly competed for the UFC.

Mixed martial arts career
Potts made his professional debut in 2011, competing exclusively for regional promotions in his native South Africa, where he was also the Extreme Fighting Championship (EFC) Heavyweight Champion.  He compiled a record of 8 – 1, finishing his opponents in all of his victories before signing with the UFC in February 2014.

Ultimate Fighting Championship
Potts made his promotional debut against Soa Palelei on 10 May 2014 at UFC Fight Night 40. Palelei won the fight via knockout in the first round.

Potts faced Anthony Hamilton on 30 August 2014 at UFC 177. Hamilton won the bout via TKO in the second round.

Potts faced Derrick Lewis on 28 February 2015 at UFC 184. He lost the fight via TKO in the second round. Potts was subsequently released from the UFC.

Return to EFC
Potts re-signed with Extreme Fighting Championship (EFC) after his release from the UFC and faced Cyril Asker. He lost via TKO (retirement) after the first round. He has fought a further five times in the EFC since then.

Championships and accomplishments
Extreme Fighting Championship 
EFC Heavyweight Championship (Two times)
Two successful title defences

Mixed martial arts record

|-
|Loss
|align=center|11–7
|Jared Vanderaa
|TKO (punches)
|EFC 76
|
|align=center|3
|align=center|3:24
|Pretoria, South Africa
|
|-
|Win
|align=center|11–6
|Karl Etherington
|TKO (punches)
|EFC 58
|
|align=center|1
|align=center|2:33
|Cape Town, South Africa
|
|-
|Win
|align=center|10–6
|Brendon Groenewald
|Submission (rear naked choke)
|EFC 55
|
|align=center|2
|align=center|4:21
|Cape Town, South Africa
|
|-
|Win
|align=center|9–6
|Vandam Mbuyi
|Submission (armbar)
|EFC 50
|
|align=center|1
|align=center|4:06
|Sun City, South Africa
|
|-
|Loss
|align=center|8–6
|Tumelo Maphutha
|Decision (unanimous)
|EFC 45
|
|align=center|3
|align=center|5:00
|Cape Town, South Africa
|
|-
|Loss
|align=center|8–5
|Cyril Asker
|TKO (retirement)
|EFC 40 
|
|align=center|1
|align=center|5:00
|Johannesburg, South Africa
|
|-
|Loss
|align=center|8–4
|Derrick Lewis
|TKO (punches)
|UFC 184
|
|align=center|2
|align=center|3:18
|Los Angeles, California, United States
|
|-
|Loss
|align=center|8–3
| Anthony Hamilton
|TKO (body punches)
|UFC 177
|
|align=center|2
|align=center|4:17
|Sacramento, California, United States
|
|-
|Loss
|align=center|8–2
|Soa Palelei
|KO (punches)
|UFC Fight Night: Brown vs. Silva
|
|align=center|1
|align=center|2:20
|Cincinnati, Ohio, United States
|
|-
|Win
|align=center|8–1
|Andrew Van Zyl
|Technical Submission (armbar)
|EFC Africa 26
|
|align=center|1
|align=center|0:44
|Gauteng, South Africa
|
|-
|Win
|align=center|7–1
|Ricky Misholas
|Submission (triangle choke)
|EFC Africa 24
|
|align=center|1
|align=center|N/A
|Gauteng, South Africa
|
|-
|Win
|align=center|6–1
|Mahmoud Hassan
|Submission (ankle lock)
|EFC Africa 21
|
|align=center|1
|align=center|0:37
|Gauteng, South Africa
|
|-
|Loss
|align=center|5–1
|Andrew Van Zyl
|Decision (unanimous)
|EFC Africa 18
|
|align=center|5
|align=center|5:00
|Gauteng, South Africa
|
|-
|Win
|align=center|5–0
|Bernardo Mikixi
|TKO (punches)
|EFC Africa 16
|
|align=center|2
|align=center|N/A
|Gauteng, South Africa
|
|-
|Win
|align=center|4–0
|Andrew Van Zyl
|Submission (guillotine choke)
|EFC Africa 11
|
|align=center|1
|align=center|3:50
|Gauteng, South Africa
|
|-
|Win
|align=center|3–0
|Norman Wessels 
|TKO (punches)
|EFC Africa 9
|
|align=center|3
|align=center|4:21
|Gauteng, South Africa
|
|-
|Win
|align=center|2–0
|Baygon Obutobe
|TKO (punches and elbows)
|EFC Africa 8
|
|align=center|4
|align=center|3:00
|Gauteng, South Africa
|
|-
|Win
|align=center|1–0
|Calven Robinson
|TKO (knee and punches)
|EFC Africa 7
|
|align=center|1
|align=center|1:23
|Gauteng, South Africa
|

See also
 List of current UFC fighters
 List of male mixed martial artists

References

External links

1978 births
Living people
South African male judoka
South African male mixed martial artists
Mixed martial artists utilizing judo
Mixed martial artists utilizing Brazilian jiu-jitsu
South African practitioners of Brazilian jiu-jitsu
Sportspeople from Cape Town
Ultimate Fighting Championship male fighters